Panorama is a conservative weekly Italian-language news magazine published in Italy and based in Milan.

History and overview
Panorama was founded in Milan in 1939. The magazine was temporarily closed by the Fascist rule in December 1940 due to the publication of the translated texts by Ada Prospero. It was relaunched by Italian publisher Arnoldo Mondadori in cooperation with the American Time Inc. group in Milan in October 1962.

The magazine came out biweekly in the initial period.

Ownership
The magazine is owned and published by Arnoldo Mondadori Editore, the largest Italian publishing house. The company is controlled by Fininvest, a financial holding company controlled by the family of Silvio Berlusconi, Italian prime minister until November 2011. Although American group Time-Life company also owned the magazine, later it left the magazine due to low circulation levels.

Circulation
Panorama had a circulation of 350,429 copies in 1984. The circulation of the magazine was 530,031 copies between September 1993 and August 1994. In 2000 it rose to 566,000 copies. The 2003 circulation of the weekly was 525,000 copies. Its circulation was 514,000 copies in 2004. It was the third best-selling news magazine in Italy in 2007 with a circulation of 479,297 copies. The circulation of the magazine was 511,349 copies in 2010. The magazine had a circulation of 303,422 copies in June 2013.
The magazine had a circulation of 80,318 copies and sold 47,425 copies in May 2021.

Management and staff
Maurizio Belpietro is the magazine's director, succeeding Giorgio Mulè and Pietro Calabrese. A former director of the magazine, Carlo Rossella, became a director of Medusa Film.

Contributors
Adolfo Battaglia, a veteran journalist and politician, is among the former contributors of Panorama.

The current contributors of Panorama include:

Maurizio Belpietro
Mario Giordano
Marcello Veneziani
Giacomo Amadori
Fausto Biloslavo
Vittorio Sgarbi
Lorenzo del Boca
Fabio Amendolara
Daniela Mattalia
Francesco Borgonovo
Giorgio Sturlese Tosi
Luca Sciortino
Carlo Puca
Luca Telese
Antonio Rossitto
Marco Morello
Marianna Baroli
Guido Castellano
Francesco Canino
Guido Fontanelli

See also
List of magazines published in Italy

References

External links

1939 establishments in Italy
Italian-language magazines
News magazines published in Italy
Political magazines published in Italy
Weekly magazines published in Italy
Magazines established in 1939
Magazines published in Milan
Arnoldo Mondadori Editore
Biweekly magazines published in Italy